Willie Johnson may refer to:

Willie Johnson (guitarist) (1923–1995), guitarist for Howlin' Wolf
Blind Willie Johnson (1897–1945), American blues and gospel singer and guitarist
Willie Boy Johnson (1935–1988), Gambino crime family enforcer
Peerie Willie Johnson (1920–2007), Shetland musician and 2005 Scottish Traditional Music Hall of Famer
Willie Johnson (singer), member of Golden Gate Jubilee Quartet

See also
Willie Johnston (born 1946), Scottish former professional football player
Bill Johnson (disambiguation)
Billy Johnson (disambiguation)
Will Johnson (disambiguation)
William Johnson (disambiguation)